Daskot is a Bulgarian village in Pavlikeni Municipality, Veliko Tarnovo Province in North Bulgaria.

History 
In the beginning of the 20th century, farming was the most popular job in the village. During the Socialist period, some people worked in the industrial part of Pavlikeni.

Villages in Veliko Tarnovo Province